Tomorrow was an American magazine published by Creative Age Press from 1941 until the 1960s. 

The magazine specialized in parapsychology and mystical subjects. It also included literary contributions as well as articles on current events. For example, the March 1943 issue (Volume 2, No. 7) focused on Latin American authors, and featured a lengthy poem by Pablo Neruda: The Seventh of November. In the same issue, American Educator and author John Erskine contributed an article on The People's Theatre.  The founding editor, Eileen J. Garrett, was one of America's best known mediums. Associate editors included Mercedes de Acosta.

In a 1963 issue, Frithjof Schuon contributed an article on "Some Notes on the Shamanism of North America", and in 1964 he wrote "Reflections on Ideological Sentimentalism".

References 

Defunct magazines published in the United States
Magazines established in 1941
Magazines disestablished in the 1960s